JSPH is an American singer and songwriter and Juris Doctor.

Early life
JSPH played football for Simon Kenton High School. He was forced to end his career as a freshman at the University of Kentucky after a concussion injury. He then attended Florida International University in Miami, later transferring back to the University of Kentucky. He graduated from the Salmon P. Chase College of Law as a Juris Doctor.

Career
JSPH released "Breathe" which was featured on Pharrell Williams' OTHERtone Playlist on Beats1 Radio. "Breathe" charted in the top 5 internationally on Apple Music. His song "ComeMyWay" was featured on the Netflix Series "On My Block".  The soundtrack also featured artists H.E.R., Brent Faiyaz and Russ and was acclaimed by Newsweek. His music was also featured on Queen Sugar produced by Ava DuVernay and Oprah Winfrey.

NPR Music featured JSPH's single "lifeLESS" and described his style as "experimental soul with an accessibility that will make him a hit among casual listeners and critics."

References

Living people
American male singer-songwriters
American singer-songwriters
Year of birth missing (living people)